Laura Sondore (born 29 December 1999) is a Latvian footballer who plays as a defender for Cypriot First Division club AEL Limassol and the Latvia women's national team.

References

1999 births
Living people
Latvian women's footballers
Women's association football defenders
Torres Calcio Femminile players
Latvia women's youth international footballers
Latvia women's international footballers
Latvian expatriate footballers
Latvian expatriate sportspeople in Italy
Expatriate women's footballers in Italy
Latvian expatriate sportspeople in Cyprus
Expatriate women's footballers in Cyprus